Hendrika Henriëtte Cornelia Stants, known as Iet Stants, (born 17 January 1903 in Utrecht, died 3 February 1968 in Culemborg) was a Dutch composer.

From 1919 she studied at the Toonkunst music school in Utrecht and her first compositions – three songs, a string quartet, and three piano pieces survive from 1920. In 1921 she wrote a second quartet, a piano quintet, a parody opera, and a pastorale for orchestra. In 1925 she completed only a piano trio and a choir piece. Insecure and disillusioned she decided to stop composing. She took an office job and composed only sporadically.

In October 1938 Stants married Leendert Sillevis from Culemborg, a widower fourteen years older than her. She began to compose again: a concerto grosso for flute, cello and string orchestra in 1940 and a suite for small orchestra in 1942.

After the war Stants dedicated herself to music education and related social activities. Among other things, she became active as a board member and in the cultural and spiritual committee of Het Nederlandse Padvindersgilde (Dutch Girl-pathfinders Guild). She died on 3 February 1968.

See also

References 

Women classical composers